Same as It Never Was is the sixth studio album by The Herbaliser. It was released on Studio !K7 in 2008.

Critical reception
John Bush of AllMusic gave the album 3 stars out of 5, saying: "There's no doubting the Herbaliser's ability to deliver exactly what they're attempting, but despite the excellent playing and good vocal features (when they occur), the songwriting and choice of material make this record inferior to the usual Herbaliser standard."

Track listing

Charts

References

External links
 

2008 albums
The Herbaliser albums
Studio !K7 albums